Tybalmia is a genus of longhorn beetles of the subfamily Lamiinae, containing the following species:

 Tybalmia breuningi Dillon & Dillon, 1952
 Tybalmia caeca Bates, 1872
 Tybalmia funeraria Bates, 1880
 Tybalmia ianthe Dillon & Dillon, 1945
 Tybalmia mydas (Lucas in Laporte, 1859)
 Tybalmia orbis Dillon & Dillon, 1945
 Tybalmia pixe Dillon & Dillon, 1945
 Tybalmia pupillata (Pascoe, 1859)
 Tybalmia tetrops Bates, 1872

References

Onciderini